Friedrich von Oesterley (5 April 1871 – 24 March 1944) was a German equestrian. He competed in the individual dressage event at the 1912 Summer Olympics.

References

External links
 

1871 births
1944 deaths
German male equestrians
Olympic equestrians of Germany
Equestrians at the 1912 Summer Olympics
Sportspeople from Göttingen